Nataly Caldas (born 26 October 1989) is an Ecuadorian swimmer. In 2019, she competed in the women's 5 km and women's 10 km events at the 2019 World Aquatics Championships held in Gwangju, South Korea. In the 5 km event she finished in 41st place and in the 10 km event she finished in 44th place.

References 

Living people
1989 births
Place of birth missing (living people)
Ecuadorian female swimmers
Female long-distance swimmers
21st-century Ecuadorian women
South American Games bronze medalists for Ecuador
Competitors at the 2018 South American Games
South American Games medalists in swimming